The Big River is a  river located in central New Hampshire in the United States.  It is a tributary of the Suncook River, part of the Merrimack River (and therefore Gulf of Maine) watershed.

Headwaters of the Big River rise on high ground in the southern corners of Alton and New Durham, New Hampshire. The river flows southeast into Strafford, then, running up against the Blue Hills Range, the river reverses course, turning west into Barnstead, where it meets the Suncook River in the village of Center Barnstead.

See also

List of rivers of New Hampshire

References

Tributaries of the Merrimack River
Rivers of New Hampshire
Rivers of Belknap County, New Hampshire
Rivers of Strafford County, New Hampshire